China's Wikipedia may refer to:

Chinese Wikipedia, the Chinese-language version of Wikipedia
Baidu Baike, a "wiki-like" Chinese-language online encyclopedia
Hudong, another "wiki-like" Chinese-language online encyclopedia
Blocking of Wikipedia in mainland China, China's policy of preventing access to Wikipedia from within the country